Joseph Barclay Pentland (17 January 1797 – 12 July 1873) was an Irish geographer, natural scientist, and traveller.  Born in Ballybofey (County Donegal, Ireland), Pentland was educated at Armagh.  He also studied in Paris, and worked with Georges Cuvier.

With Woodbine Parish, Pentland surveyed a large part of the Bolivian Andes between 1826 and 1827.  He published his Report on Bolivia in 1827.  From 1836 to 1839, he served as British consul-general in Bolivia.  He corresponded with Charles Darwin and William Buckland.

Pentland died 12 July 1873 in London, and is buried in Brompton Cemetery, London.

Legacy 
The mineral pentlandite, which Pentland first noted
The crater Pentland on the Moon
The Andean tinamou (binomial name, Nothoprocta pentlandii)
The Puna tinamou (binomial name, Tinamotis pentlandii)
The cactus Lobivia pentlandii which Pentland discovered and sent to Kew Botanic Gardens, London

Sources 
 Mineral names
 The Darwin Correspondence Online Database

References

Further reading 
Sarjeant, W.A.S. and Delair, J.B., "Joseph Pentland: a forgotten pioneer in the osteology of fossil marine reptiles," Proceedings of the Dorset Natural History and Archaeology Society, 1976, pp. 12–16.
Sarjeant, W.A.S. and Delair, J.B., "An Irishman in Cuvier’s laboratory.  The letters of Joseph Pentland, 1820-1832," Bulletin of the British Museum of Natural History, Historical Series, vol. 6, no. 7, 1979, pp. 245–319.
Sarjeant, W.A.S., "Joseph Pentland’s early geological and geographical work in Bolivia and Peru," in S. Figueiroa and M. Lopes (eds.), Geological sciences in Latin America.  Scientific relations and exchanges.  (Papers presented at the XVII INHIGEO Congress, Campinas, SP, Brazil, July 19–25, 1993).  Campinas Brazil: Universidade Estadual de Campinas.  Instituto de Geociencias, pp. 11–27.

1797 births
1873 deaths
Naturalists from Northern Ireland
Irish explorers
Irish surveyors
British diplomats
British explorers
Burials at Brompton Cemetery